Nacre, also known as mother of pearl, is an organicinorganic composite material produced by some molluscs as an inner shell layer; it is also the material of which pearls are composed. It is strong, resilient, and iridescent.

Nacre is found in some of the most ancient lineages of bivalves, gastropods, and cephalopods. However, the inner layer in the great majority of mollusc shells is porcellaneous, not nacreous, and this usually results in a non-iridescent shine, or more rarely in non-nacreous iridescence such as flame structure as is found in conch pearls.

The outer layer of cultured pearls and the inside layer of pearl oyster and freshwater pearl mussel shells are made of nacre. Other mollusc families that have a nacreous inner shell layer include marine gastropods such as the Haliotidae, the Trochidae and the Turbinidae.

Physical characteristics

Structure and appearance

Nacre is composed of hexagonal platelets of aragonite (a form of calcium carbonate) 10–20 µm wide and 0.5 µm thick arranged in a continuous parallel lamina. Depending on the species, the shape of the tablets differs; in Pinna, the tablets are rectangular, with symmetric sectors more or less soluble. Whatever the shape of the tablets, the smallest units they contain are irregular rounded granules. These layers are separated by sheets of organic matrix (interfaces) composed of elastic biopolymers (such as chitin, lustrin and silk-like proteins). This mixture of brittle platelets and the thin layers of elastic biopolymers makes the material strong and resilient, with a Young's modulus of 70 GPa and a yield stress of roughly 70 MPa (when dry). Strength and resilience are also likely to be due to adhesion by the "brickwork" arrangement of the platelets, which inhibits transverse crack propagation. This structure, spanning multiple length sizes, greatly increases its toughness, making it almost as strong as silicon.

The statistical variation of the platelets has a negative effect on the mechanical performance (stiffness, strength, and energy absorption) because statistical variation precipitates localization of deformation. However, the negative effects of statistical variations can be offset by interfaces with large strain at failure accompanied by strain hardening. On the other hand, the fracture toughness of nacre increases with moderate statistical variations which creates tough regions where the crack gets pinned. But, higher statistical variations generates very weak regions which allows the crack to propagate without much resistance causing the fracture toughness to decrease. Studies have shown that this weak structural defects act as dissipative topological defects coupled by an elastic distortion.

Nacre appears iridescent because the thickness of the aragonite platelets is close to the wavelength of visible light. These structures interfere constructively and destructively  with different wavelengths of light at different viewing angles, creating structural colours.

The crystallographic c-axis points approximately perpendicular to the shell wall, but the direction of the other axes varies between groups.  Adjacent tablets have been shown to have dramatically different c-axis orientation, generally randomly oriented within ~20° of vertical.  In bivalves and cephalopods, the b-axis points in the direction of shell growth, whereas in the monoplacophora it is the a-axis that is this way inclined. The interlocking of bricks of nacre has large impact on both the deformation mechanism as well as its toughness.  In addition, the mineral–organic interface results in enhanced resilience and strength of the organic interlayers.

Formation
Nacre formation is not fully understood. The initial onset assembly, as observed in Pinna nobilis, is driven by the aggregation of nanoparticles (~50–80 nm) within an organic matrix that arrange in fibre-like polycrystalline configurations. The particle number increases successively and, when critical packing is reached, they merge into early-nacre platelets. Nacre growth is  mediated by organics, controlling the onset, duration and form of crystal growth. Individual aragonite "bricks" are believed to quickly grow to the full height of the nacreous layer, and expand until they abut adjacent bricks. This produces the hexagonal close-packing characteristic of nacre. Bricks may nucleate on randomly dispersed elements within the organic layer, well-defined arrangements of proteins, or may grow epitaxially from mineral bridges extending from the underlying tablet. Nacre differs from fibrous aragonite – a brittle mineral of the same form – in that the growth in the c-axis (i.e., approximately perpendicular to the shell, in nacre) is slow in nacre, and fast in fibrous aragonite.

A 2021 paper in Nature Physics examined nacre from Unio pictorum, noting that in each case the initial layers of nacre laid down by the organism contained spiral defects. Defects that spiralled in opposite directions created distortions in the material that drew them towards each other as the layers built up until they merged and cancelled each other out. Later layers of nacre were found to be uniform and ordered in structure.

Function

Nacre is secreted by the epithelial cells of the mantle tissue of various molluscs. The nacre is continuously deposited onto the inner surface of the shell, the iridescent nacreous layer, commonly known as mother of pearl. The layers of nacre smooth the shell surface and help defend the soft tissues against parasites and damaging debris by entombing them in successive layers of nacre, forming either a blister pearl attached to the interior of the shell, or a free pearl within the mantle tissues. The process is called encystation and it continues as long as the mollusc lives.

In different mollusc groups

The form of nacre varies from group to group. In bivalves, the nacre layer is formed of single crystals in a hexagonal close packing.  In gastropods, crystals are twinned, and in cephalopods, they are pseudohexagonal monocrystals, which are often twinned.

Commercial sources

The main commercial sources of mother of pearl have been the pearl oyster, freshwater pearl mussels, and to a lesser extent the abalone, popular for their sturdiness and beauty in the latter half of the 19th century.

Widely used for pearl buttons especially during the 1900s, were the shells of the great green turban snail Turbo marmoratus and the large top snail, Tectus niloticus. The international trade in mother of pearl is governed by the Convention on International Trade in Endangered Species of Wild Fauna and Flora, an agreement signed by more than 170 countries.

Uses

Decorative

Architecture
Both black and white nacre are used for architectural purposes. The natural nacre may be artificially tinted to almost any color. Nacre tesserae may be cut into shapes and laminated to a ceramic tile or marble base. The tesserae are hand-placed and closely sandwiched together, creating an irregular mosaic or pattern (such as a weave). The tesserae are then lacquered and polished creating a durable and glossy surface. Instead of using a marble or tile base, the nacre tesserae can be glued to fiberglass. The result is a lightweight material that offers a seamless installation and there is no limit to the sheet size. Nacre sheets may be used on interior floors, exterior and interior walls, countertops, doors and ceilings. Insertion into architectural elements, such as columns or furniture is easily accomplished.

Musical instruments
Nacre inlay is often used for music keys and other decorative motifs on musical instruments. Many accordion and concertina bodies are completely covered in nacre, and some guitars have fingerboard or headstock inlays made of nacre (or imitation pearloid plastic inlays). The bouzouki and baglamas (Greek plucked string instruments of the lute family) typically feature nacre decorations, as does the related Middle Eastern oud (typically around the sound holes and on the back of the instrument). Bows of stringed instruments such as the violin and cello often have mother of pearl inlay at the frog. It is traditionally used on saxophone keytouches, as well as the valve buttons of trumpets and other brass instruments. The Middle Eastern goblet drum (darbuka) is commonly decorated by mother of pearl.

Other 
Mother of pearl buttons are used in clothing either for functional or decorative purposes. The Pearly Kings and Queens are an elaborate example of this.

It is sometimes used in the decorative grips of firearms, and in other gun furniture.

Mother of pearl is sometimes used to make spoon-like utensils for caviar (i.e. caviar servers) so as to not spoil the taste with metallic spoons.

Biomedical use

The biotech company Marine Biomedical, formed by a collaboration between the University of Western Australia Medical School and a Broome pearling business, is  developing a product nacre to create "PearlBone", which could be used on patients needing bone grafting and reconstructive surgery. The company is applying for regulatory approval in Australia and several other countries, and is expecting it to be approved for clinical use around 2024–5.  It is intended to build a factory in the Kimberley region, where pearl shells are plentiful, which would grind the nacre into a product fit for use in biomedical products. Future applications could include dental fillings and spinal surgery.

Manufactured nacre 
In 2012, researchers created calcium-based nacre in the laboratory by mimicking its natural growth process.

In 2014, researchers used lasers to create an analogue of nacre by engraving networks of wavy 3D "micro-cracks" in glass. When the slides were subjected to an impact, the micro-cracks absorbed and dispersed the energy, keeping the glass from shattering. Altogether, treated glass was reportedly 200 times tougher than untreated glass.

See also
 Ammolite
 Pearling in Western Australia
 Raden

References

Further reading
 
 
 Checa, Antonio G.;  Julyan H. E. Cartwright, Marc-Georg Willinger and Steven M. Stanley (Jan. 6, 2009), "The Key Role of the Surface Membrane in Why Gastropod Nacre Grows in Towers"; Proceedings of the National Academy of Sciences of the United States of America, Vol. 106, No. 1. .

External links

 Objects with mother-of-pearl in the Staten Island Historical Society Online Collections Database

Mollusc products
Pearls
Mollusc anatomy